Antonio Mennini (born 2 September 1947) is an Italian prelate of the Roman Catholic Church. He served as the Nuncio to Great Britain from 18 December 2010, having been appointed by Pope Benedict XVI, until 6 February 2017 when Pope Francis transferred him to work in the Secretariat of State in Rome where he is responsible for relations between the Holy See and Italy.

Besides his native Italian, Mennini can speak English, French, Spanish, German, Bulgarian and Russian.

Biography
Mennini was born in Rome, in a family that has strong links with the Holy See. His father, Luigi Mennini, who died in 1997, was managing director of the Holy See's Institute for Works of Religion (the Vatican Bank) at the time allegations of money laundering were made against Archbishop Paul Marcinkus, the Institute's sometime  president. Antonio  Mennini has 13 siblings, among them Pietro Mennini, who is the Procuratore della Repubblica di Chieti ("Public Prosecutor of Chieti").

Mennini was ordained to the priesthood on 14 December 1974. Mennini obtained a Doctor of Theology degree from the Pontifical Gregorian University of Rome.

Mennini is known in Italy as the priest who heard the final confession of the country’s murdered Prime Minister, Aldo Moro, in the 1970s. Moro had been kidnapped and was being held captive in a secret location by the Red Brigades, a leftist Italian militant group. Archbishop Mennini, then an assistant priest, is believed to have delivered a letter to the terrorists from Pope Paul VI and a letter to Mr Moro from his wife. Shortly after his secret mission, the Prime Minister was killed and his body dumped in central Rome. The Vatican shielded the priest from ever having to testify in subsequent state hearings concerning Moro’s abduction and murder, until Pope Francis authorized him to do so in 2015.

Diplomatic career
After obtaining the degree Doctor of Theology Mennini entered the diplomatic service of the Holy See in 1981, serving as an attache in the Pontifical Representations in Uganda and Turkey, and then in the Council for the Public Affairs of the Church.

Nuncio to Bulgaria
On 8 July 2000, Mennini was appointed Titular Archbishop of Ferentium by Pope John Paul II. Mennini received his episcopal consecration on 12 September from Cardinal Angelo Sodano, with Cardinals Camillo Ruini and Jean-Louis Tauran serving as co-consecrators.

Upon Mennini's arrival in Bulgaria, he began preparing Pope John Paul II’s 2002 pastoral visit to the Eastern European country amid great controversy. However, the visit was hailed as a success, largely because the new nuncio established excellent working relations with Orthodox leaders who had originally opposed it.

Nuncio to Russia and Uzbekistan
On 6 November 2002, Mennini was named Nuncio to Russia and from 26 July 2008 was also Nuncio to Uzbekistan. He is credited with notably improving the Holy See’s relations with the former Soviet countries in the Federation and with the Russian Orthodox Church.

As recently as 2001 Rome was criticised by the Russian Orthodox for establishing dioceses without adequate consultation in Russia. However, through the nuncio’s fence-mending efforts the situation gradually began to change and in December 2009 President Dmitry Medvedev approved the establishment of  full diplomatic relations between the two states. On 13 February 2011 Dmitry Medvedev awarded Mennini the Order of Friendship for his contribution to the development of Russian-Vatican relations.

Nuncio to Great Britain
Mennini was named Nuncio to Great Britain on 18 December 2010 following the early retirement of Archbishop Faustino Sainz Muñoz on 2 December 2010. He presented his credentials to The Queen on 2 March 2011.

One of the most important duties facing Mennini as Nuncio was to oversee the vetting process for the appointment of a substantial number of new bishops for England, Wales and Scotland.

Most significantly, Pope Benedict XVI accepted the resignation of Cardinal Keith O'Brien, Archbishop of St Andrews and Edinburgh and Britain's then most senior cleric, on 25 February 2013. Two days later, the Pope likewise accepted that of Patrick Altham Kelly, Archbishop of Liverpool. Mennini played a central role in the appointment of their successors.

A writer in the English Catholic publication The Tablet considered it likely that Mennini's appointment was recognition that delicate diplomatic work was required for the establishment of the personal ordinariate for former Anglicans in Britain.

Secretariat of State
On 20 January 2017 it was announced that Mennini was to be transferred to the Vatican to serve in the Secretariat of State. His tenure in Britain ended on 6 February. In his new post he is responsible for relations between the Holy See and Italy.

References

External links
Catholic-Hierarchy

1947 births
Living people
Clergy from Rome
21st-century Italian Roman Catholic titular archbishops
Pontifical Ecclesiastical Academy alumni
Apostolic Nuncios to Russia
Apostolic Nuncios to Great Britain
Apostolic Nuncios to Uzbekistan
Apostolic Nuncios to Bulgaria